Pitcairnia abundans is a species in the genus Pitcairnia. This species is endemic to Mexico, where it is known from the States of Oaxaca and Nayarit.

References

abundans
Endemic flora of Mexico
Plants described in 1964